Vladimir Andreyevich Zavyalov (born 7 April 1989) is a Russian professional football player. He plays for FC Dynamo Barnaul.

Club career
He made his Russian Football National League debut for FC Dynamo Barnaul on 30 March 2008 in a game against FC Sibir Novosibirsk.

External links
 

1989 births
Living people
Russian footballers
FC Dynamo Barnaul players
Association football forwards